Got My Head on Straight is an album by soul singer Billy Paul. It was produced by Kenny Gamble & Leon Huff, arranged by Bobby Martin and Lenny Pakula, and engineered by Joe Tarsia. Released in 1975, it reached #140 on the Billboard Pop Album chart and #20 on the Soul chart. It includes the singles "Be Truthful to Me" #37 R&B; "Billy's Back Home" #52 R&B; and "July, July, July, July" which did not chart.

Recording, release and critical reaction
As was customary with most PIR acts, MFSB completed the backing tracks for the album prior to Paul overdubbing the vocals in fall 1974.
 
Prior to the album's release, the single "Be Truthful to Me" was issued in late 1974. While the single did crack the top forty on the soul charts, it failed to cross over to the pop charts.

The album was well received on its release in early 1975. In its February 8, 1975 issue, Billboard noted: "After a lull in activity, Paul has come up with one of his most together efforts to date. The singing is trademarked and the orchestrations and material fit in nicely. His voice is totally enchanting and many of these cuts should break out. Some of them will get disco play. Best cuts: 'Black Wonders Of The World,' 'Billy's Back Home,' 'When It's Your Time To Go,' 'Be Truthful To Me,' Everything Must Change.' Dealers: In-store play will sell records and the packaging is beautiful."

Allmusic's Andrew Hamilton said of "Black Wonders of the World": "Above a moody but robust track that features a strident synthesizer, African drums, and Hammond organ chords, a geeked Billy Paul turns professor and lectures about the many black (people) wonders of the world, including Martin Luther King, Mahalia Jackson, Eli Whitney, Jimi Hendrix, Jackie Robinson, John Coltrane, and Billie Holiday."

Despite the enthusiasm, neither the album nor any of the singles were able to reach a broad audience. Author John A. Jackson noted that the results were "disappointing" to Paul and everyone involved due to the LP's failure to "regenerate the brief crossover success he experienced two years earlier."

Track listing
All tracks composed by Kenny Gamble & Leon Huff; except where indicated

Side one
"July, July, July, July"  -  5:30
"Billy's Back Home"  -  (Dexter Wansel)  -  4:33
"I've Got So Much to Live For"  -  4:51
"Black Wonders of the World"  -  (Kenny Gamble, Leon Huff, Billy Paul, John Whitehead, Gene McFadden)  -  8:02

Side two
"Enlightenment"  -  4:53
"When It's Your Time to Go"  -  5:02
"Be Truthful to Me" - (Kenny Gamble, Leon Huff, John Whitehead, Gene McFadden)  -  3:08
"Everything Must Change" - (Bernard Ighner)  -  5:23
"My Head's on Straight" (Kenny Gamble, Leon Huff, Billy Paul)  -  3:12

Personnel
Billy Paul - lead and backing vocals
Dexter Wansel - keyboards, synthesizers
Bobby Eli, Bunny Sigler, David Bay, Norman Harris, Roland Chambers - guitar
Eddie Green, Leon Huff - piano
Vincent Montana, Jr. - vibraphone
Anthony Jackson, Ron Baker - bass
Earl Young, Norman Farrington - drums
Don Renaldo - horns, strings
Larry Washington - congas
Lenny Pakula - organ
Carla Benson, Evette Benton, Barbara Ingram - backing vocals

Charts
Albums

Singles

References

External links
Got My Head on Straight at Discogs
Got My Head on Straight at FunkMySoul
Got My Head on Straight at DereksMusicBlog

1975 albums
Billy Paul albums
Albums produced by Kenneth Gamble
Albums produced by Leon Huff
Albums arranged by Bobby Martin
Albums recorded at Sigma Sound Studios
Philadelphia International Records albums